Allahabad-e Sofla (also Romanized as Allahābād-e Soflá; also known as Allahābād-e Pā’īn) is a village in Hoseynabad Rural District, Esmaili District, Anbarabad County, Kerman Province, Iran. At the 2006 census, its population was 451, in 107 families.

References 

Populated places in Anbarabad County